Korson is a surname. notable people with the surname include:

Adam Korson, Canadian actor
George Korson (1899–1967), American folklorist, journalist and historian

See also
Lorson
Morson